Robert E. Duvall was an American politician from Maryland. He served as a member of the Maryland House of Delegates, representing Harford County in 1856.

Career
In 1858, Duvall was appointed by governor Thomas Holliday Hicks as assistant inspector of flour. He was appointed again by governor Thomas Swann in 1868.

Duvall was a Know Nothing. Duvall served as a member of the Maryland House of Delegates, representing Harford County in 1856.

References

Year of birth unknown
Year of death missing
Maryland Know Nothings
People from Harford County, Maryland
Members of the Maryland House of Delegates

19th-century American politicians